Phaedranassa viridiflora is a species of plant that is endemic to Ecuador.  Its natural habitat is subtropical or tropical dry shrubland. It is threatened by habitat loss.

References

Flora of Ecuador
viridiflora
Endangered plants
Taxonomy articles created by Polbot